Claude Edward Bateman-Champain (30 March 1875 – 13 October 1956) was an English cricketer. A right-handed batsman and occasional right-arm slow bowler, he played eighteen matches for Gloucestershire between 1898 and 1907. A member of a cricketing family, his brothers John, Francis and Hugh all played first-class cricket; his uncles Fendall, Frederick, Robert and William Currie also played.

References
Notes

Sources

1875 births
1956 deaths
People from Richmond, London
Gloucestershire cricketers
English cricketers
Marylebone Cricket Club cricketers